Tanja Reichert (born September 19, 1977 in Vancouver, British Columbia) is a former Canadian actress.

Career
She started acting when she was 15 years of age, and she first appeared on TV  at 17 years old, when she had the role of "Shelley-Girl #2" in Breaker High for two episodes ("That Lip-Synching Feeling" and "Rooming Violations"); and she has appeared in many more films/programmes since then.

But she is probably most well known for her role in Relic Hunter, when she was Sydney Fox's assistant, Karen Petrusky, for the third and final season.

Reichert has starred in movies like Legally Blonde 2: Red, White and Blonde, as Reese Witherspoon's Delta-Nu sister; in Broken Lizard's Club Dread as Chef Kelly; Head over Heels (from Universal) as the undercover FBI partner of Freddie Prinze, Jr.; and Scary Movie (from Miramax/Disney), with the Wayans brothers.

Reichert's other notable television series credits include guest starring roles on Poltergeist: The Legacy, Beyond Belief: Fact or Fiction, The Immortal (starring Lorenzo Lamas), and Francis Ford Coppola's sci-fi series First Wave. Most recently, she had roles on the popular CBS’s series CSI: Miami, as well as The Chris Isaak Show.

In late 2006 / early 2007 she appeared in MyNetworkTV telenovela Wicked Wicked Games, playing the secretary Jennifer Harrison.

Filmography

References

External links 
 

1977 births
Actresses from Vancouver
Canadian film actresses
Canadian television actresses
Living people